20th Century Masters – The Millennium Collection: The Best of Steppenwolf, released by Universal Music as part of their 20th Century Masters – The Millennium Collection series, is a CD that collects material by Steppenwolf from 1968 to 1971.  The compilation focuses on Steppenwolf’s Dunhill recordings, with the bulk of material coming from their Steppenwolf through At Your Birthday Party albums.  While generally regarded as a solid representation of Steppenwolf’s early-period proto-metal work from the 1960s, there were no new tracks or previously unreleased songs included.  It includes liner notes by Joseph Laredo and was digitally remastered by Erick Labson (MCA Music Media Studios, North Hollywood, California).  It was certified Gold by the Recording Industry Association of America on October 29, 2004, the first output by Steppenwolf to earn such a designation since 16 Greatest Hits went gold on April 12, 1971.

Track listing

Personnel
John Kay – lead vocals, guitar
Jerry Edmonton – drums, vocals
Goldy McJohn – organ, vocals
Michael Monarch – guitar, vocals
Rushton Moreve – bass, vocals
Nick St. Nicholas – bass, vocals
Larry Byrom – guitar, vocals
George Biondo – bass, vocals
Kent Henry – guitar, vocals

References

Steppenwolf
1999 greatest hits albums
Steppenwolf (band) compilation albums
Universal Music Group compilation albums